Silicon Valley is an American comedy television series created by Mike Judge, John Altschuler and Dave Krinsky. The series focuses on five young men who found a startup company in Silicon Valley. The series premiered on April 6, 2014, on HBO.

In April 2018, HBO renewed the series for a sixth season. In May 2019, HBO confirmed that season six would be the final season and consist of seven episodes. It premiered on October 27, 2019.

Series overview

Episodes

Season 1 (2014)

Season 2 (2015)

Season 3 (2016)

Season 4 (2017)

Season 5 (2018)

Season 6 (2019)

Ratings

References

External links 
 
 
 Silicon Valley on Rotten Tomatoes

Lists of American sitcom episodes
Episodes